Michael D. MacDonald was a Republican member of the Michigan Senate, representing the 10th district from January 1, 2019 to January 1, 2023.

Career
Before being elected to the state senate, Dr. MacDonald worked in the health care field as an exercise physiologist and personal trainer for nearly 10 years prior to obtaining a Doctoral Degree in Health Care Administration in 2015.

References

Living people
Macomb Community College alumni
Western Michigan University alumni
Oakland University alumni
Republican Party Michigan state senators
21st-century American politicians
Year of birth missing (living people)